Total Politics is a British political magazine described as "a lifestyle magazine for the political community". It was first published in June 2008, and is distributed freely to all MPs, MEPs, peers, political journalists, members of the Scottish, Welsh and Northern Ireland assemblies, and all senior councillors down to district level as well as being available by subscription and sold on newsstands.

The magazine was created by the Conservative journalist Iain Dale and the political commentator and author Shane Greer. The two men launched Total Politics with some financial backing from the then Deputy Chairman of the Conservative Party, Lord Ashcroft, who in return owned a 25% stake in the parent company Biteback Media. The magazine claims to have a fundamental goal of being "unremittingly positive about the political process".. The launch editor was Sarah Mackinlay, daughter of the then Labour MP Andrew Mackinlay.

In 2012, Biteback Media was acquired by Dods.

As of mid-2022, the totalpolitics.com website and associated twitter account have been inactive since March 11, 2020.

In Conversation Interviews 
Each issue of Total Politics carries a set-piece ‘In Conversation’ interview with a senior figure from British politics. The interviews are presented in a question and answer format, with no interpretation or analysis".  In addition, the interviews include a mini-interview called the ‘Quick Fire’ which is published as a box-out and involves more light-hearted questions.  Past interviewees have included:
 Former Prime Minister Gordon Brown MP
 Mayor of London Boris Johnson
 Deputy Prime Minister Nick Clegg MP
 Former Prime Minister David Cameron MP
 Labour Party Leader Harriet Harman MP
Former Mayor of London Ken Livingstone
Former Liberal Democrat Leader Lord Ashdown
Cherie Blair
Secretary of State for Business, Innovation and Skills Vince Cable

Guide to Political Blogging 
Each year, Total Politics publishes the Guide to Political Blogging in the UK, a book which includes a list of every political blog in the UK, lists of the best blogs in each blogging category (called Top Lists) and analysis of the British political blogosphere written by experts in political blogging.  The Guide was originally published independently by Iain Dale, but was taken over by Total Politics when it launched in 2008. The Top Lists categories (as of the 2009/2010 blogging guide) are:

Top 300 UK Political Blogs
Top 100 Left of Centre Blogs
Top 100 Right of Centre Blogs
Top 75 LibDem Blogs
Top 20 Libertarian Blogs
Top 30 Green Blogs
Top 60 Welsh Blogs
Top 50 Scottish Blogs
Top 20 Northern Irish Blogs
Top 30 MP Blogs
Top 40 Councillor Blogs
Top 50 Non-Aligned Blogs
Top 30 Media Blogs

The winners in each category are determined by public vote through an email poll.  As well as being recognised in the Guide, winners are also provided with digital awards badges to put on their blogs.

Total Politics Ranking 
A common theme in Total Politics is the publication of rankings for all things politics.  This includes one-off rankings such as the ‘Top 50 Political Myths’, the ‘Top 10 Political Gifts’ and annual rankings such as the ‘Top 100 Political Journalists’ and the ‘Top 100 Public Affairs Professionals’.

Editorial Board 

Designed to ensure political neutrality, the editorial board includes the following: –

Former Liberal Democrat leader Lord Ashdown 
Journalist and history professor Brian Brivati
Shami Chakrabarti, the director of the human rights group Liberty
Conservative MP David Davis
Former Liberal Democrat Home Affairs spokesman Chris Huhne
Former Labour MPs Andrew MacKinlay and Denis MacShane
Scottish National Party MP Angus MacNeil
Former Conservative leader of Westminster City Council, Sir Simon Milton
Lord Trimble, former leader of the Ulster Unionist Party and former First Minister of Northern Ireland

References

External links 
 Total Politics (official site)

2008 establishments in the United Kingdom
Monthly magazines published in the United Kingdom
Political magazines published in the United Kingdom
Magazines established in 2008